The South and Central American Women's Handball Championship is the official competition for senior national handball teams of South America and Central America, and takes place every two years. In addition to crowning the South and Central American champions, the tournament also serves as a qualifying tournament for the World Handball Championship. The first edition was held in 2018.

Summaries

Medal table

Participating nations

See also
 2022 South and Central American Women's Junior Handball Championship

External links
Official website

 
Women's sports competitions in South America
Recurring sporting events established in 2018
South and Central America Handball Confederation competitions